The Doña María de Aragón Altarpiece was an altarpiece painted between 1596 and 1599 by El Greco for the chapel of the Colegio de la Encarnación (also known as the Colegio de doña María de Aragón) in Madrid. 
The college was secularised during Goya's lifetime and the altarpiece was dismantled. There has been much speculation over which paintings belonged to the work. The consensus view is that it consisted of six large canvases and a seventh, now lost. Five of those six canvases are now in the Prado and the sixth is in the National Museum of Art of Romania in Bucharest.

History

Composition

Names, dimensions and museums

Bibliography (in Spanish)
 Pita Andrade, José Manuel (1985). El Greco. Carrogio SA de Ediciones. .
 Cossío, Manuel B. (1965). El Greco. Espasa Calpe Argentina, S.A. .
 Gudiol, José (1982). El Greco. Ediciones Poligrafa S.A. .
 Tazartes, Mauricia (2004). «Las Obras Maestras». El Greco. 2005 Unidad Editorial S.A. .
 Buendía, José Rogelio (1988). «El Greco, humanismo y pintura». El Greco. Sarpe. .
 Ruiz Gómez, Leticia (2007). El Greco. Museo Nacional del Prado. .

External links

 Entry on the Museo del Prado website

Paintings by El Greco
1590s paintings
Paintings depicting the Crucifixion of Jesus
Musical instruments in art
Altarpieces
Paintings depicting the Annunciation
Adoration of the Shepherds in art
Paintings depicting John the Baptist
Paintings depicting Pentecost